Greenbrier Academy for Girls (GBA) is a therapeutic, college preparatory boarding school in Pence Springs, West Virginia for grades 8-12.  Surrounded by a  campus, the Academy’s main building is listed on the National Register of Historic Places. GBA is located in rural southeastern West Virginia. The Academy has been linked to multiple cases of child neglect, as well as the troubled teen industry. Greenbrier Academy announced plans to close on March 13, 2023.

Academics and Student Life 
The school is accredited by AdvancED and the North Central Association Commission on Accreditation and School Improvement, and claims that 100% of its recent graduates have matriculated to college. The school offers a traditional curriculum of high-school level Mathematics, English, Science, Social Studies, and various languages.  The average class size is about ten students.  Greenbrier Academy also offers classes in the arts, with a special focus on African Drumming and other African rituals.

The school also offers activities which include Yearbook Club, Running Club, Poetry Club, music lessons, basketball, skiing and outdoor adventures.  The school also  gives students the chance participate in service to the community and to go on service trips to Africa and Nicaragua.

Therapeutics 
The school also offers a number of therapy programs, centered on a philosophy called "Strong" or "Applied Relationality."  This philosophy is not widely recognized and seems to be based on a book by the founder of the school, self-proclaimed guru and former lawyer L. Jay Mitchell (see Controversy below).  This philosophy claims that the "primary cause" of apparently any symptoms exhibited by adolescents is that "her perceptions of past, present, and future relationsal experiences."  According to the philosophy, "Present perceptions of past experiences guide our behaviors and emotions" and that through viewing things in the appropriate context, healing can happen.  The philosophy appears to be similar to Social Cognitive Theory.

As part of its therapeutic mission, the school offers animal therapy, a family program, and something the school calls "Village" which is based on a therapeutic construct called the "Hermeneutic Circle."

The school also offers continuing care through its Alumni network.

Controversy surrounding Founder of Greenbrier Academy
Founder of Greenbrier Academy L. Jay Mitchell (or Lionel Jay Mitchell) has previously owned and operated several therapeutic programs, including Alldredge Academy, a therapeutic boarding school and wilderness program for boys.  On February 13, 2001, a student at the academy walked out in the middle of the night and hanged himself, after threatening to harm himself to staff members earlier in the day.  According to the child's parents' account of the events, though staff members, including L. Jay, had been told of two previous attempts at suicide, L. Jay decided that the boy's threats were "just manipulation, and that if they addressed it, it would foster future behavior like this so they made a conscious decision to ignore" the threats of self-harm. As a result of this incident, the school pleaded "no contest" to charges of child neglect resulting in death.  In addition, Alldredge Academy and L. Jay admitted fault and settled a civil suit relating to the death for $1.2 million.

In another incident, a boy's parents alleged that their son was forced to stand barefoot and naked in the snow on first arrival to the wilderness program.  In addition, the boy's parents alleged that two Alldredge employees "poured water down his throat, causing him to choke, and they poured water on his chest as a form of punishment. The wet clothing froze and stuck to [the boy's] body, leaving him cold throughout the day."  The boy developed frostbite in his feet as a result of these alleged actions.  The case went to arbitration and the outcome is unknown.

References

External links

Boarding schools in West Virginia
Private high schools in West Virginia
Therapeutic boarding schools in the United States